Giovanni Battista Beccaria  (3 October 1716 – 27 May 1781) was an Italian physicist. A fellow of the Royal Society, he published several papers on electrical subjects in the Phil. Trans. Beccaria was one of Benjamin Franklin's more conspicuous correspondents. His students included Joseph-Louis Lagrange, Giovanni Francesco Cigna, Giuseppe Angelo Saluzzo, and the successor to the Chair of physics, Antonio Vassalli Eandi; moreover, his researches inspired the physicists of Pavia, Alessandro Volta and Luigi Galvani. 

Beccaria did much, in the way both of experiment and exposition, to spread a knowledge of the electrical researches of Benjamin Franklin and others. In 1753, he published an important treatise on electricity, "Elettricismo artificiale e naturale libri due", which was translated into English thanks to Franklin's interest. His contributions include a classification of luminous discharges, the collection of data on atmospheric electricity, and the design of the electrical thermometer, whose invention is usually wrongly ascribed to Franklin's colleague, Ebenezer Kinnersley. Franklin noted in a letter to Cadwallader Colden that "he (Beccaria) seems a Master of Method, and has reduc'd to systematic Order the scatter'd Experiments and Positions deliver'd in my Papers." Joseph Priestly (in his "History and Present State of Electricity") declared Beccaria the "great Italian genius" who had "far surpassed everything done by French and English electricians."

Life and works 
Giovanni Battista Beccaria was born at Mondovì in 1716. In 1732, at the age of sixteen, he entered the religious Order of the Pious Schools or Piarists, where he studied, and afterward taught, grammar and rhetoric. At the same time, he applied himself with success to mathematics. He became professor of experimental physics, first at Palermo and then at Rome. His ability as instructor being soon recognized, he was appointed by royal authority professor of physics in the University of Turin (1748). He was afterwards made tutor to the young princes de Chablais and de Carignan, and continued to reside principally at Turin during the remainder of his life. Here he ardently devoted himself to researches on atmospheric electricity, in which he made liberal use of kites, rockets, and iron wire for the purpose of exploring the electrical conditions of the atmosphere. Henley's pith-ball electroscope was his recording instrument. In broken or stormy weather, positive and negative electrification were detected; whereas in calm, serene weather "the excessive or positive was always found". The sinuous or forked character of lightning was attributed to the resistance of the air; and the rupture of the shoes of a man struck by a flash, to the "moisture of the feet flying into vapour". Beccaria confirmed the observation of Andrew Gordon that water evaporates more rapidly when electrified. He was also among the first to recognize and clearly state that the electrical charge on a conductor is confined to the surface. An experimental demonstration of this law of electrostatics was devised by Cavendish in 1775 and independently by Coulomb in 1788 and popularized in 1816 by Biot, whose name it usually bears. Beccaria adopted the two-fluid theory of Franklin as well as the views of the American philosopher on the preventive and protective functions of lightning conductors.

In May 1755 Beccaria was elected Fellow of the Royal Society of London, and in 1766 he contributed a paper to the "Philosophical Transactions", in which he describes (in Latin) five of the more important of his experimental researches. In 1770 he contributed a second paper (also in Latin) in which he expounds five theorems followed by fifteen corollaries in electrostatics. In 1759, King Charles Emmanuel III of Sardinia employed him to measure the degree of meridian arc in Piedmont.

His principal work is his treatise "Dell'elettricismo artificiale e naturale" (1753), which was translated into English in 1778. Franklin considered "Dell'elettricismo" «one of the best pieces on the subject . . . in any language.»

Other works are "Lettere sull'elettricismo" (1758); "Experimenta atque observationes quibus electricitas vindex late constituitur" (1769); and "Dell'elettricità terrestre atmosferica a cielo sereno" (1775), the first extended treatise on the subject of atmospheric electricity.

Works

Notes

References
 
 
 J. L. Heilbron, Beccaria, Giambatista. Dictionary of Scientific Biography, Vol. 1, C. C. Gillispie, ed. (New York: Charles Scribner's Sons, 1970): pp. 546-549.
 

1716 births
1781 deaths
People from Mondovì
18th-century Italian physicists
Fellows of the Royal Society
Academic staff of the Sapienza University of Rome
Academic staff of the University of Palermo
Academic staff of the University of Turin
Catholic clergy scientists
Piarists